The Great Panjandrum Himself is one of sixteen picture books created by the illustrator Randolph Caldecott. The book was published in 1885 by Frederick Warne & Co. It was the last book illustrated by Caldecott, who died the following year.

The text for the book, well known during Caldecott's time, was written and published in 1775 by Samuel Foote. It is based on a line of gibberish written by Foote ("And there were present the Picninnies, and the Joblillies, and the Garyulies and the Grand Panjandrum himself, with the little round button at the top."), written to test the memory of the actor Charles Macklin, who had claimed he could repeat any text verbatim after hearing it once.

The term "panjandrum" has since become used to describe a powerful person, or a self-important official. The word is used in the 1909 song "I've Got Rings On My Fingers", "...they named him Chief Pan Jan Drum, Nabob of them all..."

During World War II, the British military named an experimental rocket-propelled weapon the Panjandrum. Such a character also appears as a deus ex machina in the Thursday Next series, set in a fictional 'BookWorld' created by the Panjandrum.

References

External links

British children's books
British picture books
1885 books
1880s children's books
Frederick Warne & Co books